Talento de Barrio World Tour was the third concert tour by reggaeton singer Daddy Yankee to promote his album Talento de Barrio.  The tour had two legs, the first in the United States and the last one in Latin America.It kick of at Viña del mar 2009 international festival and ended at Mar de Plata, Argentina on December 15, 2009.

Background 
By 2009, Barrio Fino, Barrio Fino en directo and El Cartel The Big Boss, sold over 7 million of copies worldwide and also the top selling Latin albums in the United States of 2005, 2006 and 2007. Talento de Barrio (the movie) was a box office success in Puerto Rico, breaking records in attendance. Talento de Barrio (Soundtrack), was commercial success and was quickly certified platinum in the United States and gold across Latin America.

Commercial reception 
On the First Leg of the Tour in the United States, Yankee performed in smaller venues than his previous tour The Big Boss Tour, which consisted in larger arenas but receive mixed commercial response by the audience.

In 2009, the concert at Colombia with Aventura, over 30,000 fans were reported. while in Santo Domingo was around 60,000. In Cordoba, attendance was reported of over 10,000 fans. In Chile, attendance was more than 25,000 fans. In Neuquen, Argentina attendance was 18,000. In Atofagasta, Chile, was around 12,000. The overall attendance of the second leg was 300,000 fans.

Tour dates

Attendance

Cancelled Concerts

Notes

References 

Daddy Yankee concert tours
2009 concert tours